Westoniella is a genus of Costa Rican shrubs in the tribe Astereae within the family Asteraceae.

The genus is named in  honor of US botanist Arthur S. Weston. All the species are found only in Costa Rica.

 Species

References

Asteraceae genera
Astereae
Endemic flora of Costa Rica